The Christopher Borgerding House is a historic house in Belgrade, Minnesota, United States.  It was built from 1904 to 1905 for an early settler of Belgrade who became a successful businessman and platted an expansion to the town.  The house's design exhibits Colonial Revival architecture but with unusual features, such as a deeply recessed porch, granite-and-brick first floor, and cross-gambrel roof.  The Borgerding House was listed on the National Register of Historic Places in 1982 for its local significance in the themes of architecture and commerce.  It was nominated for its unique and well preserved design and for its first owner's role in the development of Belgrade.

See also
 National Register of Historic Places listings in Stearns County, Minnesota

References

1905 establishments in Minnesota
Colonial Revival architecture in Minnesota
Houses completed in 1905
Houses in Stearns County, Minnesota
Houses on the National Register of Historic Places in Minnesota
National Register of Historic Places in Stearns County, Minnesota